The River Laggan is a small river on the Scottish island of Islay. Having gathered the waters of the Kilennan River, Barr River and Duich River / Torra River it enters the sea at the north end of Laggan Bay off Loch Indaal.

References

External links

Landforms of Islay
Laggan